The Short S.45 Seaford was a 1940s flying boat, designed as a long range maritime patrol bomber for RAF Coastal Command.
It was developed from the Short S.25 Sunderland, and initially ordered as "Sunderland Mark IV".

Background
In 1942, the Air Ministry issued Specification R.8/42 for a replacement of the Sunderland, as a long range patrol bomber for service in the Pacific Ocean. It required more powerful engines, better defensive armament, and other enhancements.

Design and development
The Sunderland Mark IV used major structural elements of the Sunderland Mark III, with a fuselage stretch of 3 ft ahead of the wing, an extended and redesigned planing bottom, the same wing with thicker Duralumin skinning, and Bristol Hercules engines. Further structural changes were made after initial flight tests. The planned armament consisted of two fixed forward-firing .303 inch (7.7 mm) Browning machine guns in the nose, a Brockhouse Engineering nose turret with twin .50 in (12.7 mm) machine guns, twin 20 mm Hispano cannon mounted in a Bristol B.17 dorsal turret, twin .50 in (12.7 mm) guns in a Glenn-Martin tail turret, and another .50 in (12.7 mm) machine gun in a hand-held waist position on each side of the fuselage. The turrets were all electrically powered. Two prototypes and thirty production aircraft were ordered as the Sunderland Mark IV.

Operational history

On 30 August 1944, the prototype (MZ269) first flew from the River Medway at Rochester. The increased engine power caused aerodynamic stability problems, and a new fin was designed with greater height with forward dorsal extension, plus a new tailplane with increased span and area. Changes were so extensive that the new aircraft was given the name Seaford. Thirty production aircraft were ordered, but the first of these flew in April 1945, well after the introduction of the Sunderland Mark V, and too late to see combat in Europe. The prototypes were powered by Hercules XVII engines of 1,680 hp (1,253 kW), but production aircraft used 1,720 hp (1,283 kW) Hercules XIX engines. The planned Glenn Martin tail turrets were never installed. Eight production Seafords were completed; the first (NJ200) was used for trials at MAEE Felixstowe. The second production Seaford (NJ201) was evaluated by RAF Transport Command, then in December 1945 it was loaned without armament to BOAC as G-AGWU, then returned to MAEE as NJ201 in February 1946. In April 1946, the other six production Seafords were delivered to No. 201 Squadron RAF for brief operational trials. In 1948, those six aircraft were modified as civilian airliners at Belfast, then leased to BOAC with the designation Solent 3.

Operators

British Overseas Airways Corporation
Royal Air Force
No. 201 Squadron RAF

Specifications (S.45 Seaford)

Survivor
Short S.45 Seaford NJ203, converted to a Short Solent in 1948, is displayed at the Oakland Aviation Museum, Oakland, California.

See also

Notes

Bibliography
 Barnes, C.H. Shorts Aircraft since 1900. Putnam, 1967, 1989 
 Green, William. War Planes of the Second World War: Volume Five Flying Boats. Macdonald, 1968. .
 London, Peter. British Flying Boats. Sutton Publishing, 2003. .
 Ogden, Bob (2007). Aviation Museums and Collections of North America. Air-Britain.

External links 

Short Seaford Flight 3 January 1946 (3 pages of diagrams and images)

1940s British patrol aircraft
Flying boats
Short Brothers aircraft
World War II British patrol aircraft
Four-engined tractor aircraft
High-wing aircraft
Aircraft first flown in 1944
Four-engined piston aircraft